Three Steps in the Dark is a 1953 British mystery film directed by Daniel Birt and starring Greta Gynt, Hugh Sinclair and Sarah Lawson. It was produced as a second feature and shot at the Kensington Studios in London. The film's sets were designed by the art director Bernard Robinson.

Plot
A rich but disliked uncle invites his relatives to a family reunion at his home.  Once the gathering is complete, he announces enigmatically that he intends to change his will before he dies, should not one of the heirs fulfill a condition. Before he can do this, he is murdered.  His niece (Gynt), a detective story writer, has to put her theories into practice by solving a real-life murder mystery.

Cast
 Greta Gynt as Sophie Burgoyne
 Hugh Sinclair as Philip Burgoyne
 Sarah Lawson as Dorothy
 Elwyn Brook-Jones as Wilbraham
 John Van Eyssen as Henry Burgoyne
 Nicholas Hannen as Arnold Burgoyne
 Hélène Cordet as Esme
 Alastair Hunter as Inspector Forbes
 Katie Johnson as Mrs. Riddle

Later history
Three Steps in the Dark appears to have been a programmer closely following the standard whodunit template, with Today's Cinema offering the analysis: "The film has a measure of well tried appeal in the matter of 'spotting the killer' and in anticipating the surprise revelation of his identity in the climax. There is the usual touch of romance to complete the formula."  There is no indication that the film was ever shown publicly again in cinemas or on television following its initial run.

The British Film Institute included the film on its "75 Most Wanted" list of missing British feature films, due in large part to interest from film historians in Birt's relatively brief directorial career, which was cut short by his death at the age of 47 in 1955. The National Film and Sound Archive in Australia subsequently informed the BFI it has the film.

References

External links 
 BFI 75 Most Wanted entry, with extensive notes
 

1953 films
1953 crime drama films
1950s mystery films
British mystery films
British crime drama films
British black-and-white films
Films directed by Daniel Birt
1950s rediscovered films
Rediscovered British films
Films shot at Kensington Studios
1950s English-language films
1950s British films